The 1981 European Ladies' Team Championship took place 24–28 June at the Tróia Resort in Carvalhal, Portugal. It was the twelfth women's golf amateur European Ladies' Team Championship.

Venue 
The course was designed by Robert Trent Jones and situated on the Tróia Peninsula, Grândola Municipality, 40 kilometres south-east of the city center of Lisbon, Portugal, stretched along the beach, with views over the sea and with sandy roughs.

The championship course was set up with par 73.

Format 
All participating teams played two qualification rounds of stroke-play with six players, counted the five best scores for each team.

The eight best teams formed flight A, in knock-out match-play over the next three days. The teams were seeded based on their positions after the stroke-play. The first placed team was drawn to play the quarter final against the eight placed team, the second against the seventh, the third against the sixth and the fourth against the fifth. In each match between two nation teams, two 18-hole foursome games and five 18-hole single games were played. Teams were allowed to switch players during the team matches, selecting other players in to the afternoon single games after the morning foursome games. Games all square after 18 holes were declared halved, if the team match was already decided.

The seven teams placed 9–15 in the qualification stroke-play formed Flight B, to play similar knock-out play to decide their final positions.

Teams 
15 nation teams contested the event. Each team consisted of six players.

Players in the leading teams

Other participating teams

Winners 
Four-times-champions team France won the opening 36-hole qualifying competition, with a score of 37 over par 767, nine strokes ahead of team Sweden. Defending champions team Ireland made it to the quarter finals, finishing eighth, on the same score as ninth-placed team Wales, but with the tie-breaking better non-counting scores. 

Individual leader in the 36-hole stroke-play competition was Charlotte Montgomery, Sweden, with a score of 1-under-par 145, three strokes ahead of her Swedish teammate Liv Wollin.

During the quarter finals, in the foursome game between  Susan Gorman / Claire Hourihane, Ireland, and Elaine Berthet / Sophie Lapaire, France, Hourihane made a hole-in-one on the 150 meters 11th hole, using a 6-iron. However, the French pair won the game and team France eventually advanced to the final of the tournament.

Team Sweden won the championship, earning their first title, beating France in the final 4–2, despite France was leading 2–0 after the morning foursomes. Playing in their ninth final, France had finished on the podium in all twelve European Ladies' Team Championships played since its inauguration in 1959. Team Spain, earned third place, beating Scotland 5–2 in the third place match.

The three teams placed first, second and third, were awarded with gold-, silver- and bronze-medals respectively, introduced by the organizing European Golf Association.

Results 
Qualification round

Team standings

* Note: In the event of a tie the order was determined by the better total non-counting scores.

Individual leaders

 Note: There was no official award for the lowest individual score.

Flight A

Bracket

Final games

* Note: Game all square after 18 holes declared halved, since team match already decided.

Final standings

Sources:

See also 
 Espirito Santo Trophy – biennial world amateur team golf championship for women organized by the International Golf Federation.
 European Amateur Team Championship – European amateur team golf championship for men organised by the European Golf Association.

References

External links 
 European Golf Association: Results

European Ladies' Team Championship
Golf tournaments in Portugal
European Ladies' Team Championship
European Ladies' Team Championship
European Ladies' Team Championship